Danny Biega (born September 29, 1991) is a Canadian former professional ice hockey defenceman. He played for the Carolina Hurricanes of the National Hockey League (NHL). He was selected by the Hurricanes in the third round (67th overall) of the 2010 NHL Entry Draft. His brother, Alex Biega, has played 250 games in the NHL. He is under contract to the Toronto Maple Leafs.

Playing career
As a youth, Biega played in the 2004 Quebec International Pee-Wee Hockey Tournament with a minor ice hockey team from West Island, Montreal.

Biega played his collegiate hockey for the Harvard Crimson in the ECAC Hockey conference. In his junior year, Biega's outstanding play was recognized when he was named the ECAC's best defensive defenceman and selected to the 2011–12 ECAC Hockey First Team. During his senior year at Harvard, Biega signed a three-year contract with the Carolina Hurricanes of the National Hockey League (NHL) and was assigned to their American Hockey League affiliate, the Charlotte Checkers.

During the 2014–15 season, Biega played for the Hurricanes of the National Hockey League. Biega made his NHL debut with the Hurricanes on March 19, 2015, in his hometown of Montreal.

Personal life
Biega is the younger brother of Alex Biega, a professional ice hockey player who is currently playing with the Toronto Maple Leafs. Biega also has two other brothers, Marc and Michael. Alex, Danny, and Michael all played hockey for Harvard University, becoming the first trio of brothers since 2000 to play for Harvard.

He retired from hockey due to repeated concussions.

Post Hockey Career
Biega is currently a managing partner of Brito Ice LLC in Massachusetts.

Career statistics

Awards and honours

References

External links

1991 births
Living people
Canadian ice hockey defencemen
Carolina Hurricanes draft picks
Carolina Hurricanes players
Charlotte Checkers (2010–) players
Harvard Crimson men's ice hockey players
Quebec Amateur Athletic Association players
Ice hockey people from Montreal
AHCA Division I men's ice hockey All-Americans